The Onida Subdivision is a branch line railway segment owned, maintained and operated by the Rapid City, Pierre and Eastern Railroad (RCPE), a subsidiary of Genesee & Wyoming. It connects the city of Onida to the company's east–west main line, the Pierre Subdivision at Blunt, South Dakota.

References

External links
: 

Dakota, Minnesota and Eastern Railroad
Rail infrastructure in South Dakota